Xavier Abril de Vivero, (4 November 1905 in Lima - 1 January 1990 in Montevideo) was a Peruvian poet and essayist who devoted time studying the poetry of César Vallejo.

Bibliography
 Exposition de poèmes et designs, París, 1927
 Various poems (in the magazine Amauta, 1926 - 1930)
 Hollywood (Madrid, 1931)
 Difícil trabajo, (Madrid, 1935)
 Descubrimiento del alba, (Lima, 1937)
 La rosa escrita, (Montevideo, 1987 and Lima, 1996)
 Declaración de nuestros días, (1988),
 Poesía inédita, (Montevideo, 1994).
 Poesía soñada, obra poética completa (Lima, UNMSM, 2006)

Essays and anthologies
 Anthology of César Vallejo (Buenos Aires, 1943).
 Vallejo: test critical approach (Buenos Aires, 1958).
 Two studies: Vallejo and Mallarmé (Bahia Blanca, 1960).
 César Vallejo or poetic theory (Madrid, 1963).
 Exegesis trílcica (Lima, 1981)

External links
Some of his poems
 
Xavier Abril recorded at the Library of Congress for the Hispanic Division's audio literary archive on November 25, 1958

20th-century Peruvian poets
Peruvian essayists
1905 births
1990 deaths
Writers from Lima
Peruvian male poets
Male essayists
20th-century essayists
20th-century male writers